Radka Pavlovčinová (born 1 February 1989) is a Slovak actress, singer, and voice actor based in the Czech Republic. She received two nominations for the Thalia Award for her performance in Robin Hood in 2010, as well as in Bratři naděje in 2022.

Early life 
Radka Pavlovčinová was born on 1 February 1989, in Senica, Czechoslovakia (now Slovakia). She was introduced to performing arts in early childhood and began dancing at 3. At the age of nine, she became the world champion in IDO's disco dance disciplines. When she was fifteen years old, she moved to Prague, Czech Republic, where she graduated from the Jaroslav Ježek Conservatory. She did not return to Slovakia and choose to pursue an acting career in the Czech Republic.

Career 
Pavlovčinová has never pursued an acting career in her native country. In the Czech Republic, she has been praised for speaking Czech without a Slovak accent, a significant advantage over other Slovak actresses working in the Czech film industry.

She made her film debut as a teenager in 2006 in the role of Karla in the comedy film Rafťáci, followed by a role in the television series Ulice and a role in the film Kdo hledá, najde.

She landed her first leading role as a ballerina in the series The First Step, making use of her experience as a professional dancer. Since then, she has starred in numerous television series such as Cesty domů, Lajna, Hvězdy nad hlavou, as well as in the American comedy series Miracle Workers, starring Daniel Radcliffe and Steve Buscemi. In 2019, she starred in the romantic comedy film Přes prsty.

As a theatre actress, she has been involved with Háta Theater, Minor Theater, or Kalich Theater.

In 2011, Pavlovčinová received her first Thalia Award nomination for her portrayal of the witch in Robin Hood. In the same year, she portrayed Esmeralda in Quasimodo. In 2021, she starred in the comedy plays Pouic Pouic and Cactus Flower.

Apart from her acting career, she is the lead singer of the funk group Drama Queens, performing with Dušan Marek, musician and former lead singer of the Czech rock band Support Lesbiens. She performed with the Cuban salsa band Caribe in the past.

In 2010, she portrayed a ballerina in Kanye West's 35-minute-long musical film Runaway.

Pavlovčinová is a co-founder of Kulturní sféra (Cultural Sphere), an organization that aims to help artists and other professionals in the performing arts industry who have struggled financially following the COVID-19 pandemic restrictions. On their behalf, she successfully negotiated with the Czech Ministry of Culture and the Ministry of Finance to implement legislative changes in the financial assistance programs introduced by the government.

She has been involved with UNICEF in providing humanitarian aid for war refugees amid Russia's invasion of Ukraine, a neighboring country of her native Slovakia.

Since June 2022, he has toured with singer Ewa Farna as both a dancer and singer.

In September 2022, she received her second nomination for the Thalia Award for her performance in Bratři naděje.

Personal life 
Pavlovčinová practices yoga and meditation and is known for leading a healthy lifestyle. She has a tattoo on her face next to her left eye. Her brother, who is six years younger, is singer, dancer and model Adonxs. Her mother is the critically acclaimed visual artist Monika Sabo. She does not keep in touch with her biological father.

She resides in Prague, Czech Republic.

Filmography

Music videos

References

External links 
 
 

Slovak actresses
Slovak singers
People from Senica
Czech actresses
21st-century Slovak actresses
21st-century Czech actresses
Slovak television actresses
Slovak film actresses
Slovak stage actresses
Czech stage actresses
Czech film actresses
Czech television actresses
1989 births
Living people